Anthene locuples, the curious ciliate blue, is a butterfly in the family Lycaenidae. It is found in Ghana, Nigeria (west and the Cross River loop), Cameroon, the Republic of the Congo, the Central African Republic and the Democratic Republic of the Congo (Kinshasa).

Adults are known to mud-puddle.

References

Butterflies described in 1898
Anthene
Butterflies of Africa
Taxa named by Henley Grose-Smith